Marius Constantin Niculae (born 16 May 1981), nicknamed  (Arrow in Romanian) is a Romanian retired footballer who played as a centre forward.

Niculae started his career with Dinamo București, progressing through their youth system to the first team squad. He made his first team debut in 1996 while he was still 15 years old and finished his time at the club having scored 44 goals in 100 Divizia A appearances. He joined Primeira Liga club Sporting CP in 2001 after signing for a reported transfer fee of $3,000,000. However, the actual transfer fee is believed to be around $4,500,000. His spell in Portugal is marked by many injuries netting only 14 goals in 59 league appearances, before leaving the club in 2005. He subsequently played for Standard Liège, Mainz 05 and Inverness, before returning to Dinamo in July 2008. Most of his four-year second spell for Dinamo, he activated as team captain until his departure to Vaslui in July 2012.

His honours include two league titles (one with Dinamo and one with Sporting), three Romanian Cups, one UEFA Cup runner-up, one Romanian Super Cup and one Portuguese Supercup. In 2001, Niculae won Divizia A Golden Boot netting 20 times. In the same year, Niculae came second in voting for the Romanian Footballer of the Year.

Described as a physical striker, with great ability in the air, Niculae made his international debut in 2000 at only 18 years old and has represented Romania at the Euro 2008. Niculae first captained his country in 2012, in the friendly match against Turkmenistan in the absence of regular captain Răzvan Raț. He managed 44 caps for Romania, scoring 15 goals.

Early life
Niculae's father Constantin Niculae is a former judoka, who worked for Dinamo București as a Fitness Coach since 1996 until his departure in 2006. Niculae began judo at the age of five, and had attained a black belt while he was trained by his father. He later stated: "The fact that I practiced this sport [judo] in the childhood, helped me to develop both mentally and physically. I think I avoided many injuries just for the fact that I learned how to fall without any danger for my health".

Niculae began his football career in 1990, playing for Dinamo under the guidance of Gheorghe Timar. Niculae spent six years at Dinamo's youth academy, before he was promoted by Cornel Dinu at the first team squad. During his first two years as a professional, he activated for both first team as well for the youth squad. During the 1997–98 season, while playing in the youth championship, goalkeeper Cristian Munteanu was sent-off, and since there were no substitutes left, Niculae replaced him without receiving any goal from Petrolul Ploieşti.

Club career

Dinamo
On 22 November 1996, Niculae became the third youngest-ever player to debut in Divizia A, at 15 years and 190 days, after coming on as a substitute in Dinamo's 5–2 win at home against Farul Constanţa.

He started the 1997–98 season, playing his first match in European competition, in a 0–2 historical defeat against Knattspyrnufélag Reykjavíkur on 23 July 1997. On 4 April 1998, he was in the start-up team in a 0–5 away defeat against Steaua, Dinamo's biggest margin defeat in the Eternal derby. One week later, Niculae managed to score his first league goals, netting a brace in a 7–1 home win against Jiul Petroşani. On 19 April, he scored another brace against FC Naţional in a 4–2 home win. He scored four goals in 12 appearances, in his second season as a professional. On 13 May, he scored another two goals against FC Naţional, in a 5–0 League Cup win, in the second round of the South Group.

Following Cornel Dinu's appointment as team manager, the 17-year-old's career began to take off, as he was used more often. He later stated: "The most close [manager] to me is Cornel Dinu. When he was Dinamo's manager, I made my first-team debut at 15 years and a half and I ended up winning two cups and one championship." He scored his first league goal from the 1998–99 season on 26 September, helping his team to demolish Universitatea Cluj 8–0. He did not find the net again until 21 November when he opened the scoreboard against Petrolul Ploieşti in a 3–2 away win. His final goals of 1998 came on 9 December in a 2–0 cup win against UM Timișoara, netting a brace. He scored his first goal for Dinamo in 1999 on 2 April in a 5–0 home win against Olimpia Satu Mare. He scored again against Universitatea Cluj on 21 April in a 6–0 away win, establishing the final score. He scored a late goal against Petrolul Ploieşti on 26 May, thus being his final goal of the season. He ended up second in the league with Dinamo, netting seven times in 28 appearances. He also reached Romanian Cup semi-finals, scoring twice for his team.

The start of the 1999–00 season saw Niculae partnering Adrian Mutu and Adrian Mihalcea in the forward line, replacing Ion Vlădoiu who eventually left Dinamo since he became just a back-up player. On 12 August, he scored his first goal in European competition in a 6–2 away win against Mondercange, netting Dinamo's sixth. Three days later, he scored the match-winning goal against Universitatea Craiova in a 2–1 league win. He scored again next round in a 4–1 home win over Petrolul Ploieşti. On 26 August, Niculae netted his first hat-trick in the second leg against Mondercange, helping his team to win 7–0. Niculae managed to score in six consecutive games in all competitions, after he netted two more goals against Astra Ploieşti and Rocar București, netting eight times overall. On 16 September, he played in a 1–0 away victory over Benfica in the UEFA Cup, coming in as a substitute for Daniel Iftodi. However, Dinamo failed to qualify further since they lost the second leg 0–2. Despite his excellent start, he did not managed to reproduce his form in the following months, netting only three goals until the end of 1999; once in the cup in a 3–1 win against Rocar București, and twice in the league against FCM Bacău and FCM Reşiţa. During the winter break, Niculae was close to a move to Serie A side U.S. Lecce, but according to Pantaleo Corvino, the player had a change of heart during the Cyprus Four Nations Football Tournament, when he was called for the first time at the national team, so therefore the transfer collapsed. During the Cyprus Tournament, Niculae suffered an injury that forced him out from the field for more than one month and a half. He made his come-back on 2 April, when he scored a brace in a 2–1 victory against FCM Bacău, opening his league account for 2000. He scored again three days later, in a 3–4 away defeat against FC Brașov. On 12 April, he scored in the second leg of the Romanian Cup semi-finals against Oțelul Galați, helping his team to win 3–1 and advance into the final. On 3 May, Niculae scored a brace against FC Argeş and he also wore the captain's armband for the first time for the closing stages of the match, after both Ionuţ Lupescu and Adrian Mihalcea were substituted off. Niculae won his first major trophy of his career as Dinamo bagged their first top-flight title in eight years, by a twelve-point margin, contributing with 13 goals in 27 appearances. Dinamo managed the Double on 13 May, as they won 2–0 against Universitatea Craiova in the Romanian Cup final, with Niculae opening the scoreboard from the penalty spot in the 31st minute. Since Niculae was not included in the squad for UEFA Euro 2000, he was selected for Romania U-21 as they were allowed to participate in the League Cup. He scored a hat-trick against Rocar București and a brace against FC Naţional for Romania U-21, before he was allowed to return to Dinamo for the final match of the South Group against Steaua București. Niculae scored his first goals in the Eternal derby against Steaua, netting twice as Dinamo gained an emphatic 7–0 win, highest margin of goals between the two teams.

With the departure of Ionuţ Lupescu during the summer of 2000, Niculae was handed the Number 10 jersey for Dinamo, switching his old squad number 16. He opened the 2000–01 season netting with a header in a UEFA Cup game against Polonia Warsaw in a 3–4 home defeat on 26 July. His league account started barely in the 5th round on 13 September, netting Dinamo's first in a 2–0 away win against Gaz Metan Mediaş. He failed to score again until 15 October, when he netted against Ceahlăul Piatra Neamţ in a 3–3 away draw. He repeated the process two more rounds, when he scored twice against Rocar București in a 3–1 away win and once against FC Braşov in 2–0 away win. On 11 November, he scored with a header against Foresta Fălticeni giving his team a 4–0 lead in the 47th minute, only to receive five goals in the last 30 minutes of play and Dinamo lose the game 4–5. Despite the team was struggling in the championship, he was having an excellent run continuing to score against Universitatea Craiova and a brace against Astra Ploieşti. On 30 November, he converted a controversial penalty against Rapid București, helping his team to qualify in the Romanian Cup semi-finals. He was selected by the fans Dinamo Player of the Year, gaining 58% of the votes. In March 2001, Niculae continued where he left off the previous year, netting against FC Naţional and Rapid București from the penalty spot. He helped his team to reach the Romanian Cup final, netting in both legs of the semi-finals against Sportul Studenţesc, Dinamo claiming a 5–3 win on aggregate. On 14 April, Niculae scored his first league hat-trick against Gaz Metan Mediaş, in a 4–2 home win. In May, Niculae continued his quest for the Golden Boot, scoring three more goals against FCM Bacău, Petrolul Ploieşti and Ceahlăul Piatra Neamţ, taking his league tally of goals up to 17. On 19 May, he scored twice against Gloria Bistriţa in a 3–1 home win. On 9 June, he scored in a 3–1 win against Universitatea Craiova, ending his tally of goals at 20, just enough for him to win the Golden Boot. He ended up second in the league with Dinamo, managing to play in 27 games. On 16 June, he scored a brace against Rocar București in the Romanian Cup final, helping his team to claim the trophy after winning 4–2. Niculae dedicated his goals to former team captain Cătălin Hîldan, who died on the pitch in a friendly match against FC Olteniţa on 5 October 2000. After the match, he stated: "We played this game thinking of Cătălin Hîldan, in his memory. I dedicate the goals I've scored to Cătălin and his family". Niculae was selected player of the season by Radio România Actualităţi, being rewarded with a Dacia SupeRNova, which he later gave to his father.

Sporting
On 7 July 2001, Niculae completed his move to Primeira Liga side Sporting Clube de Portugal signing a three-year contract, with the option of a further two seasons for a reported fee of $3,000,000, despite it is believed that the real transfer fee is estimated around $4,500,000. He was handed the number 7 shirt, previously worn by Ivaylo Yordanov. He made his debut for Sporting in a friendly match against Académica Coimbra, coming in as a substitute in the 75th minute and netting five minutes later in a 5–2 victory. After he scored, he kissed the crest of the shirt, dedicating his goal to the team supporters.

On 12 August, he made his official debut for Sporting netting the winning goal against archrivals Porto in a 1–0 home victory. Following his goal against Porto, shirt sales featuring Niculae's name and number went crazy making an income of nearly $65,000 that day. He received his first red card of his career next round, in a 0–3 away defeat against Belenenses, missing also a penalty in the process. He returned on the field following his one-match ban on 8 September, winning a penalty that gave Sporting a 1–0 lead against Leiria, after Mário Jardel converted from the spot. Eight days later, he scored a brace and won a penalty in a 3–1 win against Gil Vicente. On 1 October, Niculae scored Sporting's second in a 5–0 victory over Vitória Guimarães. On 18 October, he scored his first European goal, netting the only goal in a 1–0 win against Halmstad in UEFA Cup. On 27 October, Niculae scored another brace giving his team an easy 6–0 win, the first away win for Sporting to score six goals since 1994–95 season. Five days later, he scored again in UEFA Cup in the second leg against Halmstads, in a 6–1 victory. On 5 November, he netted again in a 5–1 win against Salgueiros. Following his excellent start for Sporting, the club set Marius Niculae a release clause of €17,500,000. On 6 December, he scored his third goal in UEFA Cup, in a 1–1 home draw against Milan. On 17 December, he finished second on the vote for Gazeta Sporturilor's Romanian Footballer of the Year Award, behind Cosmin Contra. On 22 December, in a game against Vitória de Setúbal, after a dangerous challenge, he suffered a career-threatening knee injury ending his season prematurely. Despite László Bölöni intended to give Niculae his come-back on the field faster than anticipated on Sporting's last game of the season against Beira-Mar, the doctors eventually denied the player to return. The Lions won the double, Niculae contributing with seven goals in 16 games in the league, while in the cup he played only in a 3–1 win against Vilanovense.

After a long recovery, Niculae finally returned to regular first team action in the match against Leixões, scoring Sporting's second in a 5–1 win in the Portuguese supercup. He did not find the net again until November when he scored in a 2–0 home win over Marítimo and a 3–1 away win over Beira-Mar. He also scored his first goal for Sporting in the Portuguese Cup in a 4–1 away win against Estarreja. On 10 December 2002, he broke his toe in practice leading to a six-week absence. He returned on the field on 2 February 2003, in a 4–0 home win against Paços de Ferreira, coming off the bench in the 73rd minute to assist Mario Jardel's third goal and Sporting's fourth. Three days later he netted his team's only goal in a 1–0 victory against Académica Coimbra. On 17 May, during a game against Nacional Madeira, Niculae fractured his fifth metatarsal bone in his right foot, leading to another long-term break off the field. He ended third in the league with his team, netting three goals in 17 appearances.

Having recovered from his injury, Niculae was expected to be among the substitutes against Rapid Wien, but a relapse of an older injury forced him out off the field for another four-months. He was highly acclaimed at his come-back for Sporting on 21 January 2004, in a 4–0 home win in a friendly match against VfL Wolfsburg. He scored his first competitive goal after a 367-day break on 7 February, during a 3–3 draw against Nacional Madeira. He also played with shirt number 9, switching his old squad number 7. He scored again on 10 April, in a 4–0 home victory against Estrela Amadora, coming off the bench in the 75th minute On 9 May he opened the score-sheet in the last league match of the season against Vitória Guimarães, in a 2–0 away win. He ended for the second year in a row on the third place in the league, netting three goals in 14 appearances, most of them as a substitute.

The start of the new season found Niculae continuing to struggle to find his spot in the first team squad. He played his first league match in a 0–2 away defeat against Vitória Setúbal on 12 September, coming off the bench in the 63rd minute. Two days later, he suffered another injury on his right foot while training. He came back on the field after a five-month break on 19 February 2005, in a goalless draw against Leiria, coming as a substitute for Ricardo Sá Pinto in the 81st minute. He made his first competitive start since his recovery nine days later, in an easy 4–0 home win against Estoril, scoring the first goal. On 14 April, he scored what it proved to be his final goal for Sporting, equalising with a powerful header in a 4–1 home win against Newcastle United. On 18 May, he came off the bench in the 73rd minute of the UEFA Cup final played on the home ground and lost by Sporting 1–3 over CSKA Moscow. He played his final match for the Lions four days later, playing 90 full minutes in a 2–4 home defeat against Nacional Madeira.

On 14 June, he announced he will leave the club at the end of the month, since he did not reached an agreement over a contract extension; Sporting was offering a new contract with 70% less payment, while he was willing to accept a 30% pay reduction. He ended up his four-year spell in Portugal, scoring 14 goals in 59 appearances in the league.

Standard Liège
On 31 August 2005, Niculae signed a one-year deal with Belgian First Division side Standard Liège, being given the number 9 shirt. He made his debut for Standard Liège in a 1–3 defeat against Beveren on 11 September. He scored his first goal for Standard in a 2–0 cup victory against Olympic Charleroi on 11 November. His first league goal came on 21 January 2006, in a 1–2 home defeat against Zulte Waregem. Nine minutes since his substitution in, he scored his second league goal in a 2–0 away win against Beveren on 11 February. Eleven days later, he scored again against La Louvière maintaining his team on the first place. On 17 March, he scored the winning goal in a 1–0 home victory against Genk. He managed to reach the semi-finals in the Belgian Cup with Standard while in the league he finished second. In May 2006, he refused a contract extension ending his spell in Belgium, scoring only five goals in 32 appearances in all competitions.

Mainz
After spending six months as a free agent, Niculae signed a six-month deal with German Bundesliga side Mainz 05 on 12 December 2006. On 13 January 2007, he scored his first goal for Mainz in a friendly match against Hannover 96. He made his official Mainz debut as a substitute in the 1–0 win against VfL Bochum on 27 January 2007. Four days later, he was in the start-up team in a 1–0 win against Borussia Dortmund, but he was substituted off after 58 minutes due to a poor performance. He failed to settle in the first team, leaving Bundesliga after just 162 minutes of league football without scoring a goal.

Inverness
After he passed his medical, Niculae joined Scottish Premier League's Inverness Caledonian Thistle, signing a two-year contract on 18 July 2007. His first application for a work permit was rejected, but Inverness appealed and asked fans to sign a petition to have the player's permit granted. After his appeal he was granted a work permit and became eligible to play. On 11 August, Niculae became the first Romanian who played in the SPL, after he debuted for Inverness in a 1–2 away defeat against Motherwell. He scored his first goals on 28 August, netting a brace against Arbroath in a 3–1 win in the Scottish League Cup. He opened his league account on 8 December, netting twice against Hibernian in a 2–0 victory, ending a 14-matches goalless strike in the SPL. He scored another brace in late December in a 3–1 home victory over Kilmarnock. He was awarded the Clydesdale Bank Player of the Month award for his four goals and two penalties obtained against Celtic and Heart of Midlothian in December, helping his team to pick up 15 points out of 18.

He continued his excellent form in January 2008, netting another brace and obtaining a penalty in a 3–0 victory against Gretna, giving Inverness its fifth home win in a row. On 27 February, Niculae scored again in a 1–2 away defeat against Celtic. Niculae's tenth goal of the season came against Kilmarnock, when Tokely's pass found him shaping to curl a shot high into the net.

After the resignation of chairman Alan Savage, it became clear Inverness could not afford Niculae's wages, and the club accepted an offer of €500,000 from Dinamo Bucharest, in the summer of 2008. Niculae left Inverness with a record of ten goals in 38 games in all competitions. He later became involved in a dispute with the club over a share of the transfer fee that was not paid to him when he left. As a result, Inverness were ordered by FIFA to pay £133,000 to the player. However, the Court of Arbitration for Sport overturned the decision.

Return to Dinamo and loan to Kavala

2008–2010
On 24 July 2008, Niculae signed a four-year contract with his former club Dinamo București. Due to his lack of fitness, Niculae played his first match for Dinamo since his return on 10 August, coming in as a substitute for Gabriel Boștină in a 3–2 win against CS Otopeni, netting the winning goal in the 85th minute. On 30 August, he scored against Universitatea Craiova, securing his team a 1–0 win. The first half of the season was a rather unproductive one, scoring just two goals in nine appearances. On 11 April 2009, Niculae scored his first hat-trick since his return, gaining his team a 4–1 win against Vaslui. Four days later, he scored twice in a 4–2 win against Rapid București, helping his team to qualify in the Romanian Cup semi-finals. On 21 April, Niculae netted another hat-trick in a 5–0 win against Gloria Bistriţa. For the last ten minutes of the match, since there were no substitutes left, Niculae replaced the injured goalkeeper Bogdan Lobonţ, managing to keep a clean sheet. Following Lobonţ's long-term injury, Niculae has been appointed captain for the rest of the season. On 17 May, Niculae helped his team to maintain their lead three rounds before the final wrap-up, netting Dinamo's second in a 3–1 win against FC Timișoara. However, three defeats in a row combined with Timişoara regaining their six points back from CAS, saw Dinamo ending on the third place. He ended his first season since his return scoring 12 times in Liga I, and 14 overall.

In July 2009, Niculae was close to a move to Terek Grozny, but the transfer collapsed since the Russians refused to pay the VAT. On 23 August, he scored the only goal from a 1–0 win against CFR Cluj Four days later, Niculae scored twice in a 3–0 away win against Slovan Liberec, helping his team to overcome a three goals deficit. After Niculae scored the third goal, the match went into extra-time and then penalties, in which he scored the first penalty. Dinamo qualified into the Group stages, following a 9–8 win at the penalty shootout. On 14 September, following a 0–1 defeat against Oţelul Galaţi, Gabriel Tamaş was removed as the captain of Dinamo, and replaced by Niculae. He suffered an injury, but since he was misdiagnosed by doctor Liviu Bătineanu, Niculae was sidelined for nearly three months. He made his come-back on 23 November, coming in as a substitute and missing a penalty in a 0–2 defeat against FC Timişoara. Five days later, he scored the 2–0 goal against Unirea Alba Iulia, closing the scoreboard. On 3 December, Niculae scored the two goals that brought Dinamo the victory against Sturm Graz in a 2–1 home win. On 21 February 2010, Niculae scored in the 17th minute the 2–0 goal against Universitatea Craiova, which proved to be the winning goal in their 2–1 win. On 6 May, Niculae scored in the 1–2 defeat against FC Timişoara, ending a ten-matches goalless strike. The match against Timişoara was his last of the season due to an injury. He ended sixth with his team in Liga I, netting four times in the championship, and eight overall.

On 15 July, Niculae was sent-off in Europa League's first leg of the second qualifying round against Olimpia Bălţi, receiving a two-matches ban. He scored his first goal of the season on 8 August in a 2–2 draw against Pandurii, netting Dinamo's second with a last-minute equalise. On 21 August, Niculae helped his team to demolish FCM Târgu Mureș, scoring Dinamo's fourth in a 6–2 win. On 17 October, Niculae scored from the penalty spot in the 35th minute of the Eternal derby, the winning goal in Dinamo's 2–1 win over Steaua București. This was also Niculae's first league goal against Steaua. On 26 October, he scored his final goal from 2010, opening the scoreboard against ALRO Slatina in a 3–1 win in the Romanian Cup.

Loan to Kavala
On 19 January 2011, it was confirmed that Niculae had joined Kavala on a six-month loan deal. He made his Kavala debut four days later in a 3–0 home win over Iraklis Thessaloniki, playing with the number 29 shirt. He scored his first goal for Kavala in a 1–0 home win against Kerkyra on 6 February. On 27 February, Niculae opened the score in a 2–0 away win against PAOK. His goal was selected by EPAE as the Goal of the Round. On 3 April, he netted Kavala's only goal in a 1–3 away defeat against Olympiacos. He scored again in his next game, scoring Kavala's equaliser in a 1–1 home draw against Skoda Xanthi. Niculae ended his spell in Greece netting four times in 12 appearances.

2011–2012
Despite Niculae was expected to leave Dinamo in the summer break, on 11 July he extended his contract until December 2012, accepting a 40% pay reduction. Niculae started the season with a goal in the first league game, netting with a header Dinamo's only goal in a 1–0 home win against FCM Târgu Mureş. He scored a brace in the second league game in a 5–0 away win against Gaz Metan Mediaş, the first for Dinamo on the Gaz Metan Stadium from the past 11 years. He continued his excellent form in the third round, scoring once from the penalty spot and providing one assist for Ionel Dănciulescu in a 2–0 win against Pandurii Târgu Jiu. He also scored once in a 1–2 away defeat against Vorskla Poltava from the first leg of Europa League's Play-off, on 18 August. Ten days later, he netted the winning goal in a 2–1 victory against Oţelul Galaţi. On 25 September, he scored another brace against Petrolul Ploieşti, taking his tally of goals to seven, his most prolific start from his career. He was also selected four times in the Team of the Week, after only eight rounds. On 17 October, Niculae scored a hat-trick against Ceahlăul, in a 5–0 away win. On 5 November, he scored another brace in a 3–2 victory against CFR Cluj, netting the winning goal in the stoppage time. On 5 December, he scored from the penalty spot in the Eternal derby, in a 1–3 defeat against Steaua București. Twelve days later he converted a controversial penalty kick, in a 1–0 victory against FCM Târgu Mureş, giving Dinamo an end of 2011 as winter champions. On 12 February 2012, Niculae signed a new deal with Dinamo, extending his contract until 2014. Later that month, Niculae has been appointed team captain, taking over the leadership from Dănciulescu. He scored in three matches in a row against Pandurii, Sportul Studenţesc and Oţelul Galaţi, continuing his quest for the Golden Boot. He also received his first red card from Liga I against Oţelul, ending a 182 matches run without being sent-off. On 8 May, Niculae scored the only goal in a 1–0 win against Voinţa Sibiu. On 23 May, Niculae captained Dinamo in the Romanian Cup final against Rapid București, until he was substituted in the 81st minute. Dinamo won its first trophy in five years, after a 1–0 victory. Niculae lifted the trophy along with Dănciulescu. He ended fifth in Liga I with Dinamo, netting 19 times in the league and 20 overall.

On 14 July, Niculae lifted his second trophy after Dinamo won 6–4 at the penalty shootout CFR Cluj in the Romanian Supercup. This was also Niculae's last match played for Dinamo.

Vaslui
On 20 July, Niculae signed a two-year contract with Vaslui, for an undisclosed fee, estimated by media to be around €300,000. Two days later, he was in the start-up team, in Vaslui's opening against Rapid, counting his league debut for his new team. One week later, Niculae scored Vaslui's third in a 3–0 home league victory over Petrolul Ploieşti, counting his first goal in the yellow-green shirt. On 8 August, Niculae scored his first goal for Vaslui in the European competitions, in a 1–4 home defeat against Fenerbahçe. On 18 August, Niculae scored one goal but he also missed a penalty in a 3–0 away win against Gloria Bistriţa. He scored his first hat-trick for Vaslui on 29 September against Concordia Chiajna in a 3–0 home win.

In January 2013, Niculae was closed to return to Sporting Lisbon, but because in the season 2012–13 he played for two teams, Dinamo and Vaslui, his transfer was cancelled.

Shandong Luneng
In February 2013, Niculae started negotiations with the Chinese squad Shandong Luneng. On 19 February, the Asian club announced that the player was officially signed. On 26 February, he scored his first goal for Shandong in a friendly match against Chongqing F.C.

International career
After representing Romania at the U-16 and U-18 levels, Niculae was promoted to the U-21 level. Niculae's form for Dinamo saw him selected for the Romania U-21 team to play Bulgaria U-21 on 3 March 1999, and he marked his debut with the second goal as Romania won 3–1. He played his first official match for Romania U-21 on 26 March, in a 0–1 defeat against Slovakia U-21, coming in as a substitute for Marius Luca in the second half. Despite he played all six remained qualifiers, Niculae hasn't scored a single goal as Romania failed to qualify at the European Championship. Since he was still eligible to play for Romania U-18, Niculae was called up by coach Gheorghe Cristoloveanu for 2000 European Under-18 Championship qualifiers. He scored a brace on the first match against Bosnia and Herzegovina in a 3–1 win, but he was sent off in the second match against Bulgaria alongside teammates Adrian Olah and Tiberiu Bălan, ending his career for Romania U-18. Romania drew in the final match against Ukraine, thus failing to qualify for the play-off.

On 21 January 2000, Niculae was called up to the Romania national team for the first time. On 2 February, he was in the start-up team against Latvia, counting his debut for the senior squad, at only 18 years old. Same as he did while playing for Romania U-21, Niculae marked his debut for the senior squad with a goal, netting Romania's second in a 2–0 win. Despite he scored 20 goals for Dinamo in the 1999–00 season, Niculae was not included by Emerich Ienei in the preliminary squad for UEFA Euro 2000.

On 2 September, Niculae scored a brace for Romania U-21 against Lithuania in the first match from the 2002 European Championship qualifiers, counting his first goals in an official match. On 6 October, Niculae played his final match for the U-21 squad, netting Romania's only goal in the 1–1 draw against European Championship holders Italy.

On 5 December, Niculae scored his first brace for Romania in a 2–3 defeat against Algeria. Three days later, he scored another brace against the same opponent. On 24 March 2001, Niculae played his first qualifying match for Romania, in a 0–2 defeat against Italy. On 2 June, he scored another brace for Romania against Hungary. He scored his tenth international goal on 10 November in a 2002 World Cup Play-off, where Romania lost 1–2 against Slovenia. Romania failed to qualify to the 2002 World Cup, since they managed only a draw in the second leg. On 20 August 2002, Niculae was recalled for Romania, ending a nine-month absence caused by a long-term injury.

On 28 April 2004, Niculae returned at the national team, coming as a late substitute in a 5–1 thrashing win against Germany national team, the worst away defeat for the Germans since the past 65 years. It was his first match for Romania since November 2002. On 8 September, Niculae scored a brace in a 2006 World Cup qualifying match against Andorra, ending a nearly three-year goalless strike for Romania.

On 12 March 2008, Niculae was recalled to play for Romania following a two-year break, last playing against Colombia in May 2006. He marked his return with an assist for Daniel Niculae and with a goal following Bănel Nicoliță's cross, winning against Russia with a crushing 3–0. On 15 May, he was included by Victor Pițurcă in the preliminary squad for UEFA Euro 2008. He was kept for the final 23-man squad, for Euro 2008, where he wore the number 18 shirt. He played his first match from the "Group of Death" in a goalless draw against France, coming in as a substitute for Adrian Mutu in the second half. On 17 June, he was in the start-up team from the third match of the group, against Netherlands. Romania lost 0–2, thus failing to advance further from the Group stages.

On 27 January 2012, Niculae was handed the captaincy for the first time in a friendly against Turkmenistan, becoming the 89th captain for Romania of all-time. Romania won 4–0, with Niculae scoring a brace.

Personal life
On 29 June 2008, Niculae married Cristina Vasilescu after eight years of dating. She gave birth to their daughter, Raisa Elena Niculae, on 24 August 2011. Niculae had a conflict with his father for many years due to his relationship with Cristina. They eventually reconciled in late 2007.

Niculae is well known for his friendship with former Dinamo captain Cătălin Hîldan, who died on the pitch in a friendly match against FC Olteniţa on 5 October 2000. They played together for both junior and senior squad. He dedicated his first league goal against Steaua to Hîldan. After the match, he gave his shirt to Hîldan's nephew, Cătălin who was named after him.

Other than the fact that they share birthplace, he has no connection with namesake and fellow international Daniel Niculae.

Career statistics

Club

1Include one match and one goal in the Portuguese Supercup
2Include one match in the Romanian Supercup

International appearances

International goals

Honours

Club
Dinamo București
Liga I: 1999–00
Romanian Cup: 1999–00, 2000–01, 2011–12
Romanian Supercup: 2012

Sporting
Primeira Liga: 2001–02
Portuguese Cup: 2001–02
Portuguese Supercup: 2002
UEFA Cup: Runner-up: 2004–05

Individual
Divizia A Golden Boot : 2000–01
Scottish Premier League Player of the Month: December 2007

References

External links

 

1981 births
Living people
Footballers from Bucharest
Romanian footballers
Association football forwards
FC Dinamo București players
FC Vaslui players
Sporting CP footballers
Sporting CP B players
Standard Liège players
1. FSV Mainz 05 players
Inverness Caledonian Thistle F.C. players
Kavala F.C. players
Chinese Super League players
Shandong Taishan F.C. players
Şanlıurfaspor footballers
Liga I players
Primeira Liga players
Belgian Pro League players
Bundesliga players
Scottish Premier League players
Super League Greece players
Ukrainian Premier League players
TFF First League players
Romania international footballers
UEFA Euro 2008 players
Romanian expatriate footballers
Expatriate footballers in Portugal
Expatriate footballers in Belgium
Expatriate footballers in Germany
Expatriate footballers in Scotland
Expatriate footballers in Greece
Expatriate footballers in China
Expatriate footballers in Ukraine
Expatriate footballers in Turkey
Romanian expatriate sportspeople in Portugal
Romanian expatriate sportspeople in Belgium
Romanian expatriate sportspeople in Germany
Romanian expatriate sportspeople in Scotland
Romanian expatriate sportspeople in Greece
Romanian expatriate sportspeople in China
Romanian expatriate sportspeople in Ukraine
Romanian expatriate sportspeople in Turkey